Héctor Miguel Antonio Dada Hirezi (born 12 April 1938) is a former Salvadoran politician from the Christian Democratic Party who was a member of the Revolutionary Government Junta of El Salvador in 1980. He resigned from his position on 3 March 1980 after the assassination of Mario Zamora, another PDC politician.

References 

Salvadoran politicians
People of the Salvadoran Civil War
1938 births
Living people